Panther Swamp National Wildlife Refuge is one of seven refuges in the Theodore Roosevelt National Wildlife Refuge Complex in Mississippi. Established in 1978, Panther Swamp National Wildlife Refuge encompasses . Included in those acres is one of the largest blocks (21,000 acres) of bottomland forest in the lower Mississippi River alluvial floodplain. The upland areas or ridges often crest at no more than one foot above swamp areas, and contain nuttall, willow and water oaks and other species while overcup oak, bitter pecan and ash dominate the transition zone from swamp to upland. Additional habitat types consist of reforested and agricultural areas.

In addition to providing resting and feeding areas for over 100,000 wintering waterfowl annually, the refuge also provides habitat for 200 species of neotropical migratory songbirds. Resident species making their home among the woodlands, sloughs, and reforested areas include the American alligator, white-tail deer, otter, swamp rabbit, wild turkey, squirrel, and other various small fur-bearers such as mink and raccoon.

References
Refuge website

National Wildlife Refuges in Mississippi
Protected areas established in 1978
Protected areas of Yazoo County, Mississippi
Wetlands of Mississippi
Landforms of Yazoo County, Mississippi
1978 establishments in Mississippi